Bacillemma is a monotypic genus of Thai araneomorph spiders in the family Tetrablemmidae containing the single species, Bacillemma leclerci. It was first described by Christa Laetitia Deeleman-Reinhold in 1993, and is found in Thailand.

See also
 List of Tetrablemmidae species

References

Monotypic Araneomorphae genera
Spiders of Asia
Tetrablemmidae